Masjid-e-Aktharunnissa Begum, otherwise Ameerpet Mosque, is a very old and famous mosque in Ameerpet, Hyderabad, India, established by the Nawab family in memory of Aktharunnissa Begum Saheba wife of Nawab Farooq Ali Khan in her estate at Ameerpet X road. (FOUNDER NAWAB MOHD HYDER ALI KHAN (HYDER NAWAB)

The mosque is situated on the main road of Ameerpet in the commercial and educational hub of Hyderabad. The mosque is famously known for organising feasts in Ramadan during iftar for people who come to offer prayers from last several years.

Every Day of Ramzan https://www.thebetterindia.com/60971/ramzan-iftar-dinner-hyderabad-mosque/

The mosque is situated next to the new landmark of Hyderabad i.e. " Ameerpet metro Station".

Masjid Location at Ameerpet

External links
 Mosque official website
 Results of Google search 
 Facebook page 
 TheBetterIndia.com: article on iftar

Mosques in Hyderabad, India